T'utura (Quechua for Schoenoplectus californicus, also spelled Totora) is a  mountain in the Bolivian Andes. It is located in the Cochabamba Department, in the northern part of the Tapacari Province. T'utura lies northwest of Warawarani and northeast of Waylluma.

References 

Mountains of Cochabamba Department